Walton Hall was a 17th-century historic country house, set in a  estate, which was demolished in the early 20th century. Sometimes referred to as Walton Old Hall, it was situated at the centre of the Walton Hall Park in Walton (formerly Walton-on-the-Hill), Liverpool. Its former residents were Liverpool merchants and the last two families to reside at Walton Hall profited from the Atlantic slave trade. In the 19th century it was the home of Thomas Leyland during his second and third term as Lord Mayor of Liverpool.

History
It is highly likely that stone construction had existed during the Anglo-Saxon period, and perhaps as far back to the Roman period. The name Walton derived from the Old English "walla" (meaning Briton) and "tun" (settlement). In terms of recorded history, the land on which Walton Old Hall was first built had numerous owners after the Norman Conquest, when lands across England were requisitioned and redistributed to Companions of William the Conqueror. The land is listed in the Domesday Book. Roger the Poitevin received the West Derby Hundred as a reward. Title of the land passed to his sheriff, Geoffrey de Valognes. 

An early medieval moated ancient hall would have been demolished and partially rebuilt on several occasions.  The title of the estate later passed to Gilbert (or "Waldeve") de Walton by King John in 1189. A moated lodge was built in the 14th century by this family. Following the death of Roger de Walton in the 15th century, ownership descended through a sequence of wealthy families through marriage, including the Crosse, Chorley, Fazakerley and finally the Briers or Breres in 1708, who remained at Walton Hall until it was sold to one of the earliest inhabitants of Hanover Street, John Atherton in 1746; although some historians have reported the purchase of Walton Hall to have occurred a few years earlier. Such transfers of ownership would have been relatively uncommon, since property such as Walton Hall had historically passed from one generation to another. The structure at the time would have been between 100 and 145 years old. Records show Nicholas Fazakerley acted as an agent in the purchase from Roger and Lawrence Briers. As well as a lawyer, Fazakerley was the Tory MP for Preston from 1732 to 1767. Atherton's home town.

Some of the land adjoining Walton Hall passed from Fazakerley to James Stanley, 10th Earl of Derby and the Earl of Sefton a few decades prior.

Athertons of Walton Hall
Three generations of Athertons have been recorded as residents of Walton Hall. John Atherton (1697–1768), the elder brother of William Atherton, relocated from Preston to Liverpool as an aspiring young merchant, and became involved in numerous privateering syndicates. Some of his privateering vessels were built in Norfolk, Virginia and were sized around 250 tons. Thurloe, one of his hackboats captured the Admiral of Bordeaux as a prize ship during June 1745, the year prior to purchasing the Walton Hall. Atherton was also highly involved in the Atlantic slave trade and the triangular trade. At least 18 slave voyages between 1737 and 1757 are on record. Atherton donated land in Liverpool allowing the town to expand.  This was unlikely to atone for the origin of his wealth, simply a vehicle to elevate his social status, and marry Frances Richmond, the granddaughter of Sylvester Richmond, Lord Mayor of Liverpool (1672–73). Their daughter Catherine (1735–1819) grew up in Walton Hall and married Legh Richmond, a clergyman and the founder of one of the first Friendly societies in England. The Athertons also owned plantations in the Colony of Jamaica since before the mid 1760s. His connection with Fazarkeley and the profits from privateering and slavery had quickly elevated his position in society, allowing not only to purchase Walton Hall, but to be elected to public roles in Liverpool. Peter Bold, became president of the Liverpool Royal Infirmary, which opened in 1743, replacing his friend, Nicholas Fazakerley.  Atherton was the treasurer on two occasions (1752 and 1761). He also sent his son John to Cambridge. Both John Snr and Jnr are listed in the electoral roll of 1761 under Union Chapel. In 1766 John Snr kept offices in Hanover St, his former home, whilst his son had offices in Wolstenholme's St. John Atherton Snr died in 1768. His will dated 4 February 1768, devised other property, in addition to Walton Hall, such as Banister Hall in Walton-le-Dale, which he purchased in 1739, to his son in 1768.

His son, John Atherton (1738-1786) entered St John's College, Cambridge in 1756. John Jnr married Anna Jacson of Cheshire, followed by Joanna Bird, and inherited Walton Hall in 1768, along with property in the Preston area. It is unknown as to whether he was involved in slave trading, however he benefited from the profits of the Jamaican sugar plantations and inherited wealth generated by his fathers slave trading which continued beyond the birth of his own son, John Joseph (1756–1809). His son enrolled at Trinity College, Cambridge in 1778 at the age of 17. Whilst his son was studying at Cambridge, John Jnr of Walton became High Sheriff of Lancashire in 1780. Records show that he remarried and died whilst in Gloucester, likely en route to, or from, business interests in Bristol. He is buried in Gloucester Cathedral and a plaque there refers to John Atherton of Walton Hall, Liverpool. His daughter Frances Margaretta (1778–1850) went on to marry a plantation owner and moved to Plymouth, North Carolina after his death.

Walton Hall's ownership by the Atherton family was coming to an end. John Joseph Atherton continued to profit from slavery that likely facilitated his acceptance to the University of Cambridge, as with his father. After his studies he purchased his commission as an officer in a British Army regiment of his choice.  John Joseph further elevated his standing, by marrying into an ancient noble family. The wedding to Mariann Mitford of Mitford Manor took place when he was a Major in the  3rd regiment of Light Dragoons in 1797. The Leeds Intelligencer reported on Monday 19 December 1796 (page 3) "On Wednesday was married, John Joseph Atherton, Esq; of Walton-Hall, in Lancashire, to Miss Mitford, daughter of Bertram Mitford, Esq; of Mitford-castle, in Northumberland". Since John Joseph's father had died, it is likely that he did not spend much time at Walton Hall. His wife who originated from Northumberland, a distant region from Liverpool, maybe struggled to accommodate herself into Liverpool society, centred around trade and commerce. 

In 1803, a relative,  William Atherton of  Green Park, Trelawny parish died childless and left a third of his estate to Colonel John Joseph Atherton of Walton Hall. He purchased Street Court, a manor in Kingsland, Herefordshire. When he disposed of Walton Hall, he became a member of the Herefordshire Agricultural Society and sold Walton Hall at auction in 1802 to Liverpool businessman, Thomas Leyland. This date of sale is inconsistent with other sources that refer to 1803 and 1804. A document in the national archives refers to John Joseph Atherton being the former owner of Walton Hall in 1808.

Despite the sale of Walton Hall to Thomas Leyland, it is possible that the Atherton family reserved the right to use the title "of Walton Hall". The Naval Biographical Dictionary entry for Lt Bertram Atherton of 1824, refers to the son of Colonel Atherton of Walton Hall. It is possible that their information was simply inaccurate or the biographical entry is referring to the historical sense.

Whether Walton Hall or a nearby property in Walton remained in the ownership of the Atherton family until 1824 or thereabouts, is unknown. However the English actress and opera singer, Lucia Elizabeth Vestris refers to having visited Colonel Atherton at Walton Hall in 1819. This may be another error since he died in 1809. It is possible that John Joseph's son attained the same rank, and styled himself as Colonel Atherton of Walton Hall. The South African database 1820 settlers contains an entry to Colonel John Atherton of Walton Hall. These descendants were farmers in Cape Colony, with a future generation relocating to Anaheim, California, in the 1880s as ostrich farmers.

Thomas Leyland and his heirs
The new owner of Walton Hall was the slave trader and banker Thomas Leyland (1752–1827). He served as Lord Mayor of the Borough of Liverpool on two more occasions; (1814–15) and (1820–21). Leyland was a Liverpool banker, businessman and lottery winner, who invested some of his winnings into the Atlantic slave trade. At least 69 slave voyages from Liverpool are in his name and are estimated to have delivered 22,365 slaves to the Americas. This estimate excludes the number of enslaved who did not survive the ocean voyage in chains, often due to overcrowding, susceptibility to disease, or by being a victim of a merciless crew, who had a free rein, and often executed the enslaved or threw their victims overboard whilst alive during times when water or food was in very short supply. This trade brought incredible riches to Leyland whilst at Walton Hall. A plantation in British Guiana was established as Walton Hall. However it is, as yet, unknown as to whether this is down to Leyland or Atherton, or a business partner, or perhaps Walton Hall, West Yorkshire. With the passing of the Slave Trade Act 1807, Leyland continued to reside at Walton Hall, he entered into a partnership with Richard Bullin, a Staffordshire Ware merchant, who married Leyland's sister Margaret and established the Leyland & Bullins Bank. His widow continued to reside at Walton Hall, right up until her death in 1839. Leyland's two nephews, Richard and Christopher Bullin were his primary business partners and they became his beneficiaries, inheriting the Walton estate, on the condition they both assumed the Leyland name and coat of arms, as per instructions in Leyland’s Will. Both nephews died childless and ownership of Walton Hall passed to their younger sister, Dorothy and her husband John Wrench Naylor (1813–1889).  The condition of Walton Hall had seen better days and it soon fell into complete disrepair after their deaths. Walton Hall would remain within the family for one more generation whilst continuing to rapidly deteriorate. It is unlikely to have been inhabited by its owners during the first part of the 20th century.

The estate was inherited by his son Christopher John Naylor (1849–1926), who changed his name to Leyland in 1893. Walton became part of Liverpool Corporation in 1895. The city at the time was rapidly expanding, incorporating former villages which became urban areas in a couple of generations. It ceased to have any of its former rural appeal, and the area no longer suited the landed gentry, in the same manner as Halsnead Hall in Whiston, Merseyside. The Liverpool Corporation purchased Walton Hall and by 1907 had demolished the ancient hall.

Description
From historical illustrations and pictures from the Victorian era, the facade of the property dated from the Jacobean era. The grand entrance to this former estate had large wrought iron gates set back from Haggerston Road. The estate had a half a mile long driveway leading down to the former 17th century hall, and was flanked by Rhododendron. When Walton Hall was put up for auction in 1802, it was described as "A residence admirably suited to a commercial gentleman of the first importance." Some sources refer to the auction taking place in 1804. One hundred years later it was demolished, no longer having any purpose. This was despite remnants of the earlier structure dating back to the 14th century being found during the dismantling process.

Location

Walton Hall Park
The origins of the park and former location of Walton Old Hall dates back to Henry de Walton, steward of the West Derby Hundred in 1199.

The Liverpool Corporation purchased Walton Hall, together with the surrounding   estate in the early 20th century and demolished the ancient hall. A triangular plot was identified to be designated as a  public space which was named Walton Hall Park. 60% of the original estate was allocated for residential development. A design for a Walton Hall Park by H. Chalton Bradshaw was agreed, however works were delayed due to the onset of World War I, when the land was requisitioned to be used as a munitions depot. Ownership was restored in 1924 and it was developed into Walton Hall Park. The park was official opened to the public on 18 July 1934 by George V, in a ceremony to coincide with its his visit to Liverpool and the opening of the Queensway tunnel.

Walton Hall Avenue
The name of Walton Hall Avenue has been questioned a number of times since Walton Hall was once the primary residence of John Atherton and Thomas Leyland, who both benefited from the Atlantic slave trade. However the avenue is named after the "de Walton" family, who owned the lands during the later part of the Middle Ages, for over 350 years, with a total of 650 years of continuous family ownership; if including the maternal lineage from "de Walton", onto their descendants, the Crosse family and onto Chorley, Fazakerley and Briers/Breres, who sold it in 1746.

See also
 History of Liverpool
 Centre for the Study of the Legacies of British Slave-ownership
 Slavery in Britain
 International Slavery Museum

References

Country houses in Lancashire
British country houses destroyed in the 20th century
Demolished buildings and structures in Liverpool
Buildings and structures demolished in the 1900s